Preston Oshita (born June 26, 1993), better known by his stage name Towkio, is an American rapper from Chicago, Illinois. He was previously known as Young P, Preston San, and Tokyo Shawn. He is a member of the Savemoney crew. His debut studio album, WWW., was released in 2018.

Early life
On June 26, 1993, Towkio was born Preston Oshita in Chicago, Illinois to a Mexican mother and a Japanese father. He has two older brothers. He attended Lane Tech College Prep High School.

Career
In 2012, Towkio released a collaborative EP with producer Mojek, titled Community Service. In 2014, he released another EP, titled Hot Chips n Chop Stix, which was produced by A Billion Young.

In 2015, Towkio released a mixtape, titled .Wav Theory, which featured contributions from Chance the Rapper, Vic Mensa, Kaytranada, and Donnie Trumpet. It was included on year-end lists by publications such as Complex, Chicago Tribune, and RedEye. He was included on HipHopDXs "Top 8 Rising Stars of 2015" list. In 2016, Towkio was featured alongside Justin Bieber on Chance the Rapper's song, "Juke Jam", from his third mixtape, Coloring Book. That same year, he released an EP, titled Community Service 2.

In 2018, Towkio released his debut studio album, titled WWW., which included the previously released singles, namely "Drift", "Hot Shit", "Swim", "Symphony", and "2 Da Moon". It included guest appearances from Teddy Jackson, Grace Weber, SZA, Vic Mensa, and Njomza.

Style and influences
Towkio's musical style has been described by Chicago Tribune as "an adventurous mix of rap, '90s soul, jazz and generally weird, fuzzed-out beats." He cited Kanye West and Lil Wayne as his biggest influences.

Controversy
In January 2019, Towkio was accused by a woman of sexual assault on Twitter. He denied the allegations, stating that they "were in an ongoing consensual sexual relationship dating back to 2014 which even included other women." He added, "It is my hope that her and I can engage in a dialogue in a place where she feels comfortable to discuss our past relationship and her feelings."

Discography

Studio albums
 WWW. (2018)

Mixtapes
 .Wav Theory (2015)

EPs
 Community Service (2012) 
 Hot Chips n Chop Stix (2014)
 Community Service 2 (2016)

Singles
 "Drift" (2017)
 "Hot Shit" (2017)
 "Swim" (2017)
 "Symphony" (2018)
 "2 Da Moon" (2018)
 "Billi" (2019)
 "Too Many Times" (2020)

Other charted songs

Guest appearances

References

External links
 
 

1993 births
Living people
Rappers from Chicago
American rappers of Mexican descent
American musicians of Japanese descent
21st-century American rappers